R. Christopher White is a three time Oscar-nominated visual effects artist.

Oscar history
Both nominations are in the category of Academy Award for Best Visual Effects.

84th Academy Awards-Nominated for Rise of the Planet of the Apes, nomination shared with Daniel Barrett, Dan Lemmon and Joe Letteri. Lost to Hugo.
85th Academy Awards-Nominated for The Hobbit: An Unexpected Journey, nomination shared with David Clayton, Joe Letteri and Eric Saindon.  Lost to Life of Pi.

References

External links

Visual effects supervisors
Living people
Year of birth missing (living people)
Place of birth missing (living people)